Franciszek Zabłocki (2 January 1754, Volhynia – 10 September 1821, Końskowola), is considered the most distinguished Polish comic dramatist and satirist of the Enlightenment period. He descends from an old aristocratic family of Poland with coat of arms Łada. He translated many French comedies, among others those by Molière, but also wrote his own plays concentrating on Polish issues.

From 1774, he worked in the Commission for National Education and in 1794, he took part in the Kościuszko Uprising. During the next year he gave up literature and became a priest.

Literary career
Zabłocki's literary career began with the publication of his work in the Polish literary magazine  ("Pleasant and Useful Amusements"). The magazine was the first of its kind in Poland, and was launched in the year 1770.

During King Stanislaw August's reign, Warsaw was the scene of great literary activity. The King used to host literary figures for dinner every Thursday. Zablocki was a regular invitee to these parties, which included in its guest list such Polish luminaries as Adam Naruszewicz and Ignacy Krasicki. During one such meeting, Zabłocki was asked to read his first comedy Fri Zabobonnik.

After that Zablocki turned to writing plays, producing an astounding 40 plays in ten years. He mostly wrote comedies. His major works are Amphitryon (1783), Sarmatism (1785), Muhammad Harlequin (1785), King of Bliss in the Country (1787), Yellow Nightcap (1783), Doctor of Lublin (1781), Gamrat (1785), and The Marriage of Figaro (1786).

References

See also
 Zablocki family

19th-century Polish nobility
1754 births
1821 deaths
18th-century Polish–Lithuanian poets
18th-century Polish–Lithuanian dramatists and playwrights
Polish male dramatists and playwrights
Polish male poets
18th-century male writers
18th-century Polish nobility
18th-century Polish–Lithuanian writers
19th-century Polish writers